USS Mahopac may refer to the following ships operated by the United States Navy:

 , was an armored monitor launched 17 May 1864 and sold 25 March 1902
 , was a tugboat launched 27 May 1919 and decommissioned 12 September 1946
 , was a tugboat originally launched as ATA-196 21 December 1944, renamed Mahopac 16 July 1948 and transferred to Taiwan in 1976

United States Navy ship names